Revived Communist Party of Georgia (SAKP) was a communist party in Georgia. Founded in 1997. The party is now dissolved.

The party had a 105-member central committee elected on a two-year mandate. A CC Bureau was constituted with 21 members. The party claimed to have 17,500 members divided in 32 regional organizations. It published Tskhovreba.

The chairman of the party was Shalva Berianidze. The second secretary was Zakaria Menteshashvili.

Initially the party was part of the electoral bloc "Revived Communists and People's Patriots" together with the Democratic Union of Georgia. It then shifted, ahead of the 1999 elections and joined the bloc "Communists - Stalinists" which had been formed by Communist Party of Georgia and Political Party "Stalineli".

The party advocated a foreign policy of active neutrality. The party was opposed to separatism.

It was recognized as the legal inheritor of the Communist Party of Georgia.

Communist parties in Georgia (country)
Defunct political parties in Georgia (country)